Adaklı is a town and seat of the Adaklı District of Bingöl Province in Turkey. The town is populated by Kurds and had a population of 3,063 in 2021.

The town is divided into the neighborhoods of Afet Konutları, Arıcı, Demiroluk, Döşlüce, Güngörsün, Merkez and Yeşiltepe.

References

Towns in Turkey
Populated places in Bingöl Province
Adaklı District
Kurdish settlements in Bingöl Province